Father Robert Brown S.J. (1877 – 1947) was the third Prefect of Zambesi, (appointed 1922) and the first Prefect of Salisbury, Southern Rhodesia, after the Prefecture was renamed in 1927. He was appointed as such on 14 July 1927. He resigned in 1929.

External links
 Catholic Hierarchy profile

1877 births
1947 deaths
Date of death missing
People from Harare
Rhodesian Roman Catholic priests
Rhodesian Jesuits
20th-century Roman Catholic priests
Roman Catholic bishops of Harare